Kones Ku (also Romanized as Kones Kū; also known as Konūs Kūh) is a village in Tameshkol Rural District, Nashta District, Tonekabon County, Mazandaran Province, Iran. At the 2006 census, its population was 319, in 71 families.

References 

Populated places in Tonekabon County